The University of Guyana, in Georgetown, Guyana, is Guyana's national higher education institution. It was established in April 1963 with the following Mission: "To discover, generate, disseminate, and apply knowledge of the highest standard for the service of the community, the nation, and of all mankind within an atmosphere of academic freedom that allows for free and critical enquiry." 

The University of Guyana offers more than 60 under-graduate and graduate programmes, including in Natural Sciences, Engineering, Environmental Studies, Forestry, Urban Planning and Management, Tourism Studies, Education, Creative Arts, Economics, Law, Medicine, Optometry and Nursing. Several online programmes are available, as are extramural classes through the IDCE at four locations, in Georgetown and the towns of Anna Regina, Essequibo; Linden, Upper Demerara; and New Amsterdam, Berbice. The institution has a 2016 enrollment of some 8,000 students, and it has graduated more than 20,000 students, who have gone on to represent all professional careers locally, regionally and internationally. The university also is a major contributor to the public and private sectors and to the national economy of Guyana.

University of Guyana, Tain Campus 
University of Guyana, Tain Campus became operational in 2000. It was established with the intention of making University education more accessible to Berbicians

History
Cheddi Jagan, then Premier of British Guiana, considered that the University of the West Indies, to which his government had contributed since 1948, was not meeting the demand of his countrymen for higher education. On 4 January 1962, Jagan wrote to Harold Drayton, then in Ghana, to ask him to seek the advice of W.E.B. Du Bois on starting a new university.

Drayton returned to British Guiana in December 1962, and it was on his advice that Jagan wrote to socialist scholars in the United Kingdom and United States, including Joan Robinson at the University of Cambridge, Paul Baran at Stanford University, and Lancelot Hogben at Birmingham to involve them in the recruitment of staff.

The university opened on the grounds of Queen's College in late 1963. Its first chancellor was Edgar Mortimer Duke and its first Principal and Vice-Chancellor was the British biologist and mathematician Lancelot Hogben.

The University of Guyana is Guyana's sole national higher education institution. It was established in April 1963 with the following Mission: “To discover, generate, disseminate, and apply knowledge of the highest standard for the service of the community, the nation, and of all mankind within an atmosphere of academic freedom that allows for free and critical enquiry.” It began its operations in October of the same year at Queen's College, the nation's premier secondary school, before moving to the Turkeyen Campus in 1970. At first, programmes were confined to the Arts, Natural Sciences, and Social Sciences. A Faculty of Education was created in 1967, and this was followed by the Faculty of Technology in 1969, the Institute for Distance and Continuing Education (IDCE), began as an extramural unit, in 1975, the Faculties of Agriculture (1977) and  Health Sciences (1981), the latter as an outgrowth of Natural Sciences.

A Forestry Unit was established in 1987 and it subsequently became part of the Faculty of Agriculture, and in 2003 the Faculties of Arts and Education merged to become the School of Education and Humanities. Additionally, the turn of the Millennium saw the formation of the School of Earth and Environmental Sciences (SEES), born of the merger of the Geography Department and the Environmental Studies Unit. Also created were the Biodiversity Centre, which is pertinent to the activities pursued by SEES and the Faculty of Agriculture and Forestry, and a Centre for Information Technology (CIT), which serves the entire university. The University of Guyana expanded in 2000 with the addition of the Tain Campus in the county of Berbice. (In October 2016, as part of a broader reorganization, SEES was transformed into the Faculty of Earth and Environmental Studies, with a Dean as academic and administrative head of the unit.)

The university offers certificate, diploma, associate degree, undergraduate degree, graduate (post-graduate) degree, and professional degree programs. These programmes are delivered through the following seven organizational units, called Faculties, each of which is headed by a Dean: Agriculture and Forestry; Earth and Environmental Studies; Education and Humanities; Health Sciences, with a School of Medicine; Natural Sciences; Social Sciences; and Technology. The largest unit is the Faculty of Social Sciences, with the following seven departments: Business and Management Studies; Centre for Communication Studies; Economics; Government and International Affairs; Graduate Studies; Law; and Sociology. The Department of Business and Management Studies, the largest unit in the Faculty of Social Sciences, offers three programmes; Accounting, Banking and Finance, and Marketing. As well, it has about 1,500 students, the single largest group in the Faculty of Social Sciences, and 15 faculty (10 full-time and 5 part-time). Moreover, it jointly manages the licensed Commonwealth of Learning Masters in Business Administration, and Public Affairs (CMBA/PA).

The university established its first doctoral program, the PhD in Biodiversity, in 2019.  This program is interdisciplinary, spanning three Faculties: Earth and Environmental Sciences, Natural Sciences, and Agriculture and Forestry.  The first graduates received their degrees in 2021.

Organisation and structure 

The university is divided into a number of faculties:
 Faculty of Earth and Environmental Sciences
 Faculty of Natural Sciences
 Faculty of Social Sciences
 Faculty of Education and Humanities
 Faculty of Health Sciences
 Faculty of Technology
 Faculty of Agriculture and Forestry
 School of Entrepreneurship and Business Innovation (SEBI)
 Institute of Distance and Continuing Education

Notable people

Alumni
 Mahadai Das, Guyanese writer
 M. Jamal Deen, FRSC FCAE FINAE, Professor and Senior Canada Research Chair, McMaster University, Canada
 Odeen Ishmael, Guyanese diplomat and ambassador
 Denis Williams, Guyanese painter and archaeologist
 Shana Yardan, Indo-Guyanese poet

Faculty and administrators
 Joyce Sparer Adler, American critic, playwright, and teacher, as well as a founding faculty of the university in 1963
 Derek Bickerton, former lecturer, now Professor Emeritus of Linguistics at University of Hawai'i, Honolulu
 Horace B. Davis, United States Marxian economist
 Michael Gilkes, Guyanese writer and academic
 Stanley Greaves, Guyanese painter, former head of Creative Arts at the university
 Richard Hart, Jamaican lawyer and politician
 Lancelot Hogben, English zoologist and geneticist
 Abdur Rahman Slade Hopkinson, Guyanese writer and professor at the university (1966–68)
 Ali Mazrui, African and Islamic studies academic
 Clem Seecharan, Guyanese writer
 Bertrand Ramcharan, former Chancellor of the university
 Shridath Ramphal, former Guyanese foreign minister (1972–75) and the second Commonwealth Secretary General (1975–90)
 Walter Rodney, Pan-African writer and political theorist
 Rupert Roopnaraine, Guyanese writer, politician and academic
Clive Y. Thomas, retired Professor of Economics and Director of the Institute of Development Studies

See also 
 Association of Commonwealth Universities
 University of the West Indies

References

External links 
 Official Website: University of Guyana

 
Universities in Guyana
Educational institutions established in 1963
Higher education in Guyana
1963 establishments in British Guiana